Kelli Harral (born November 28, 1993) is a model and beauty queen from Fort Stockton, TX. She was crowned Miss Texas Teen USA in 2009 after an unsuccessful run in 2008.  She represented Texas at the Miss Teen USA 2009 pageant. She owns and operates her own dance studio, Kelli's Dance Studio LLC in Fort Stockton.

References

1993 births
Living people
21st-century Miss Teen USA delegates
People from Fort Stockton, Texas
2009 beauty pageant contestants